Malcolm Hill (born 4 August 1954) is an Australian former cyclist.

Cycling career
Despite being an Australian, he became the British track champion, winning the British National Individual Sprint Championships in 1974. He also became an Australian national champion after winning the 1 mile championships in 1978, at the Australian National Track Championships.

References

1954 births
Living people
Australian male cyclists
Australian track cyclists
20th-century Australian people
21st-century Australian people